Alfred Walton Hinds (July 25, 1874 – December 25, 1957) was a United States Navy captain who served as the 17th Naval Governor of Guam. His early naval service included serving as Assistant Engineer aboard , the United States Navy's first battleship, where he was reprimanded for an accident aboard in 1896. In 1911, Hinds joined the staff of the United States Naval Academy, heading the Department of Marine Engineering and Naval Construction, writing a textbook on the subject while there.

From September 23, 1913, to March 28, 1914, Hinds served as acting Governor of Guam. Having already helped form the policies of the previous governor, Hinds continued much of the practices of the earlier administration. He successfully drew new import and export businesses to the island, though he failed in his attempts to further development of Guam as a key naval outpost. Following his governorship, Hinds commanded various ships and eventually became marine superintendent of the Panama Canal in 1924, serving in that office until early 1925.

Life
Hinds was born on July 25, 1874, in Marshall County, Alabama, the son of Margaret Rebecca (Pickett) Hinds and Byram Wilborn Hinds. His father was a physician and had served as a lieutenant in the Confederate States Army during the American Civil War. Among his siblings was Ernest Hinds, a U.S. Army major general.

He was a member of the New York Yacht Club.

Naval career
Hinds graduated from the United States Naval Academy in 1894. He served as Assistant Engineer aboard , the first battleship commissioned by the United States Navy. The Navy publicly reprimanded him for his role in an accident aboard the vessel in September 1896. In 1901, he served temporarily aboard . In 1908, as a lieutenant commander, the Navy ordered him aboard .

In 1911, Hinds headed the Department of Marine Engineering and Naval Construction at the United States Naval Academy. There, he also co-authored the book Marine and Naval Boilers with Lieutenant Commander Frank Lyon. The book served as a textbook for midshipmen at the Naval Academy. In 1918, he was given command of USS Rochester. During his command, the ship came to the aid of the British steamer Atlantian. Though Hinds ordered the engagement of the U-boat that had attacked the ship, but the crew proved unable to find it. In 1924, Hinds became marine superintendent of the Panama Canal, keeping that position until February 23, 1925.

Governorship
Hinds served as acting Naval Governor of Guam from September 23, 1913, to March 28, 1914. Prior to becoming governor, Hinds served as public works officer for the island under Governor Robert Coontz, and continued much of the same policies he advocated in the position after taking the governorship. Hinds expressed fear that the large numbers of Japanese tourists to the island performing espionage. He also raised concerns about occupations of the surrounding islands by Japan. He successfully drew new American importers and exporters to the island, including San Francisco company Atkins, Kroll & Company.

As governor, Hinds strongly promoted the utilization of Guam as an area for key naval bases to be built upon. He advocated for construction of a base to commence quickly using improvised dredging equipment from the Panama Canal. However, various engineers and the Chief of the Bureau of Yards and Docks dismissed the proposal as both unorthodox and originating from the wrong office. Hinds viewed Guam as of little importance other than as a naval outpost, stating in 1915 that "Except as a naval base-a place from which to sail forth to 'capture or destroy the enemy fleet'-Guam has no value to the navy and is, perhaps, of but little interest to naval officers."

Published works

Personal life 
On April 10, 1902, Hinds married Mary Beardslee (1874-1952) at May Memorial Church in Syracuse, New York. They had one son, Walton Beardslee Hinds (1904-1973).

In 1931, Hinds and his family moved to Coronado, California.

Hinds died on December 25, 1957.

References

External links 
 Alfred Walton Hinds at findagrave.com
 Alfred Hinds at Lucky Bag via archive.org

1874 births
1957 deaths
Burials at Fort Rosecrans National Cemetery
Governors of Guam
Members of the New York Yacht Club
People from Coronado, California
People from Marshall County, Alabama
United States Naval Academy faculty
United States Naval Academy alumni
Writers from Alabama
Military personnel from Alabama